{{DISPLAYTITLE:Technetium (99mTc) nofetumomab merpentan}}

Technetium (99mTc) nofetumomab merpentan (trade name Verluma) is a mouse monoclonal antibody derivative used in the diagnosis of lung cancer, gastrointestinal, breast, ovary, pancreas, kidney, cervix, and bladder carcinoma. The antibody part, nofetumomab, is attached to the chelator merpentan, which links it to the radioisotope technetium-99m (99mTc).

Nofetumomab
Nofetumomab is an antibody fragment that recognises the pancarcinoma glycoprotein antigen EpCAM. and/or CD20/MS4A1

It is the Fab part of murine MAb NR-LU-10.

Merpentan
The chelator part : merpentan is a phenthioate ligand, 2,3,5,6-tetrafluorophenyl-4,5-bis-5-[1-ethoxyethyl]-thioacetoamidopentanoate.

Phenthioate
Phenthioate is an insecticide (Cidial) = O,o-dimethyl-S-(carbethoxy-phenylmethyl)dithiophosphate

References 

Technetium compounds
Technetium-99m
Monoclonal antibodies for tumors
Antibody-drug conjugates
Radiopharmaceuticals